kt Rolster is a South Korean multi-gaming organization founded in 1999 with Korea Telecom as its head sponsor. A member of the Korean e-Sports Association, KT Rolster holds one of the richest and most successful StarCraft teams in the world, as well as one of the most successful League of Legends teams in Korea. The StarCraft team has fielded several legendary players throughout the pro-gaming scenes of StarCraft: Brood War and StarCraft II, such as Flash, Nal rA, YellOw, NaDa, NesTea, Reach, Life, TY and Zest.

History 
When the organization was created in 1999, it consisted solely of a StarCraft team which was named KTF n016 Progame Team after its head sponsor, Korea Telecom Freetel. In 2001, the team was renamed KTF MagicNs. When the sponsor merged with Korean Telecom, the organization subsequently went through several name changes and eventually ended up as KT Rolster (short for "Roller Coaster") in August 2009. The team transitioned to Starcraft II during the hybrid 2011-2012 Proleague Season 2.

In October 2012, kt Rolster added two League of Legends teams with members from teams NaJin Shield and the recently disbanded StarTale.

kt Rolster reached the quarterfinals of the 2015 League of Legends World Championship and 2018 League of Legends World Championship.

Roster

Major tournament results

StarCraft/StarCraft 2 
 2009-2010 Shinhan Bank StarCraft Proleague Champions
 2010-2011 Shinhan Bank StarCraft Proleague Champions
 2014 SK Telecom StarCraft II Proleague Champions

League of Legends

Arrows 
 HOT6iX Champions Summer 2014 Champions

Bullets 
 Asian Indoor-Martial Arts Games 2013 Gold Medallists
 Intel Extreme Masters Season VIII World Champions

Merged Team 
League of Legends World Championship 2015 Quarter-Finals
KeSPA Cup 2017 Champion
League of Legends Champions Korea 2018 Summer Split Champion
League of Legends World Championship 2018 Quarter-Finals

References

External links 
 Official website 
 Facebook

Esports teams based in South Korea
Rolster
StarCraft teams
League of Legends Champions Korea teams
 
Team Razer